The 1928 Kansas State Wildcats football team represented Kansas State University in the 1928 college football season.

Schedule

References

Kansas State
Kansas State Wildcats football seasons
Kansas State Wildcats football